Ezequiel Fernandes dos Santos (born 8 April 1996), also known as Ezequiel, is a football player who currently plays for Timor-Leste national football team.

International career
Ezequiel made his senior international debut against Brunei national football team in the 2014 AFF Suzuki Cup qualification on 12 October 2014.

References

External links
 

1996 births
Living people
East Timorese footballers
Timor-Leste international footballers
Association football defenders
Footballers at the 2014 Asian Games
Asian Games competitors for East Timor